The Cefa Natural Park is a protected area (natural park category V IUCN) situated in Romania, on the administrative territory of Bihor County.

Location 
The Natural Park is located at the west limit of the Bihor county with Hungary, on the Pannonian-Bulgarian migration corridor, one of the main bird migration corridors in Europe.

Description 
Cefa Natural Park with an area of 5.005 ha was declared natural protected area by the Government Decision Number 1217 of December 02, 2010 (published in Romanian Official Paper Number 840 of December 15, 2010) and represents a large area with swamps, canals, floodplains, forest (Rădvani Forest) and pastures, and is a wetland of international importance especially a waterfowl habitat and terrestrial species.

Fauna 

Species of birds: grey heron (Ardea cinerea), little egret (Egretta garzetta), eastern imperial eagle (Aquila heliaca), squacco heron (Ardeolla raloides), common pochard (Aythya ferina), Eurasian bittern (Botaurus stellaris), white stork (Ciconia ciconia), black stork (Ciconia nigra), pallid harrier (Circus macrourus), mute swan (Cygnus olor), Sanderling (Calidris alba), black-throated loon (Gavia artica), common gull (Larus canus), red-crested pochard (Netta rufina), yellow wagtail (Motacilla flava), lesser black-backed gull (Larus fuscus), black-headed gull (Larus ridibundus), great grey shrike (Lanius excubitor) or Eurasian golden oriole (Oriolus oriolus).

Access 
 National road DN79 Timișoara - Arad - Inand - county road DJ797 - Cefa

Gallery
Species of fauna

References

External links 
  www.welcometoromania.ro - Cefa, Natural park, Ponds

Protected areas of Romania
Geography of Bihor County
Protected areas established in 2010
Tourist attractions in Bihor County